Joshua Coon is a professor of chemistry and biomolecular chemistry and the inaugural holder of the Thomas and Margaret Pyle Chair at the University of Wisconsin–Madison, and an affiliate of the Morgridge Institute for Research.

Coon develops scientific instruments to measure molecules in living systems. He focuses specifically on the use of mass spectrometry to measure the molecular mass of biomolecules, and its application to proteomics. Joshua Coon, along with John Syka, developed electron-transfer dissociation (ETD) while working as a postdoctoral student in Donald Hunt's lab at the University of Virginia.

Early life and education
Coon was born in Mount Pleasant, Michigan.
Coon earned his B.Sc. from Central Michigan University in 1988. He received his Ph.D. from the University of Florida in 2002, where he worked with Willard Harrison.

Career
Coon was a postdoctoral student in Donald Hunt's lab at the University of Virginia from 2002 to 2005. There Joshua Coon and John Syka developed electron-transfer dissociation (ETD).

In 2005, Coon joined the University of Wisconsin-Madison. He became an Associate Professor in 2010, and a Professor in 2012.

Research interests
 Mass spectrometry
 Electron-transfer dissociation
 Proteomics
 Quantitative proteomics and Isobaric labeling

Awards
 2018, Discovery in Proteomic Sciences Award from the Human Proteome Organization (HUPO).
 2012, Biemann Medal, for work on electron-transfer dissociation (ETD)
 2010, Pittsburgh Conference Achievement Award
 2009, Ken Standing Award, University of Manitoba
 2008, National Science Foundation CAREER Award
 2007, American Society of Mass Spectrometry Research Award for “significant achievement in basic or applied mass spectrometry made by an individual early in his or her career”
 2007, Beckman Young Investigators Award
 2007, Eli Lilly and Company Young Investigator Award
 2006, One of "Tomorrow's PIs" chosen by Genome Technology magazine

External links
Joshua J. Coon (University of Wisconsin-Madison Department of Chemistry)

References

21st-century American chemists
Mass spectrometrists
Living people
Year of birth missing (living people)